NLB Group is the largest banking and financial group in Slovenia, with the core of its activity being in Southeast Europe.

History
Founded in 1994, the bank now covers markets with a population of approximately 17.4 million people. In addition to NLB d.d., a main entity in Slovenia, NLB Group comprises several subsidiary banks in Southeast Europe: NLB Banka Skopje, NLB Banka Sarajevo, NLB Banka Banja Luka, NLB Banka Prishtina, NLB Komercijalna banka, NLB Banka Podgorica, N Banka, several companies for ancillary services (asset management, leasing, real estate management etc.) and a limited number of non-core subsidiaries controlled wind-down.

NLB d.d. is as of 14 November 2018 a publicly listed company owned by a diversified investor base and whose largest shareholder is the Republic of Slovenia with a 25% plus one share. With the acquisition of the Serbian Komercijalna banka in December 2020, the Group further strengthened its strategic and systemic position in the region and now holds a top 3 position in six out of seven markets where it has a banking presence.

In March 2022, the EU unit of Sberbank went into insolvency due to the EU sanctions in reaction to the 2022 Russian invasion of Ukraine and the Single Resolution Board decided to transfer all shares of the Sberbank's Slovenian subsidiary, later renamed to N Banka, to NLB. On the 2 March, NLB officially bought the local unit of Sberbank, thus increasing its assets by approximately 1.0 billion euros.

In 2022, NLB Group’s result after tax amounted to EUR 446.9 million, with the acquisition of N Banka in March significantly influencing the full-year business results of the Group.

See also
 List of banks in Slovenia

References

External links
 

Banks of Slovenia
Companies based in Ljubljana
Banks established in 1994
Slovenian brands
1994 establishments in Slovenia
Banks under direct supervision of the European Central Bank